Angelo Antonazzo (born 2 October 1981) is an Italian footballer who plays as a defender for Hellas Taranto.

Antonazzo previously played 5 Serie D seasons, one Serie C2, one Serie C1, three Serie B before signed by A.C. ChievoVerona on 25 June 2008, along with Nicolas Frey. He deal was part of the deal that Salvatore Bruno and Michele Troiano went to Modena outright. He then farmed to Frosinone in join-ownership. He was bought back in June 2009 and loaned to Serie B side Empoli.

On 16 August 2010 he joined Taranto on a 3-year contract.
As of 2013 He has joined Serie B Club Reggina for the remainder of the 2012/2013 season.

References

External links 
gazzetta.it

1981 births
Living people
Italian footballers
F.C. Grosseto S.S.D. players
Bologna F.C. 1909 players
Modena F.C. players
Frosinone Calcio players
A.S. Gubbio 1910 players
A.C. ChievoVerona players
Empoli F.C. players
Taranto F.C. 1927 players
Reggina 1914 players
Association football defenders
Sportspeople from Taranto
Serie B players